Massey Lake is an unincorporated community in Anderson County, located within the U.S. state of Texas. It is located within the Palestine, Texas micropolitan area.

History
Massey Lake was named for an early settler who owned the land in this area. A post office was established at Massey Lake in 1922 and remained in operation until around 1956. In 1925, the settlement had 20 residents and it was that same number throughout 1966 when the last population figures for the community were available. During the 1930s and 1940s, there was only one business, two churches, and a few scattered housing units in the community. In 1985, it had a church, two businesses, and numerous homes.

Geography

Demographics 
Massey Lake is estimated to have a population of 20, and according to the Texas Almanac, has remained at around 20 people between 1925 and 1966, the last year in which data was collected. In the 2020 census, Massey Lake and its zip code were part of a mostly-middle aged census grouping of just under 10,000 people.

Political affiliation 
Massey Lake is strongly aligned with the Republican Party. In the 2020 United States presidential election, Republican incumbent president Donald Trump won 643 votes and about 75% of the vote share within the community, compared to the 202 votes going to Democratic nominee Joe Biden. The Republican Party also represents Massey Lake in the House of Representatives, as Massey Lake is presently part of Texas's 5th congressional district, presently served by Republican Lance Gooden.

Education
Massey Lake had three schools, with two during the 1930s and 1940s and only one in 1985. Today the community is served by the Cayuga Independent School District.

Infrastructure and transport 
Texas Route 2054 serves as the main road through the community. Being a rural town, Massey Lake's direct transport links are minimal, with the closest commercial airport, Tyler Pounds Regional Airport, being 59 miles away.

References

Unincorporated communities in Anderson County, Texas
Unincorporated communities in Texas